Shankhlal Majhi is an Indian politician and member of the Sixteenth Legislative Assembly of Uttar Pradesh. Majhi is a member of the Samajwadi Party and represents Katehari constituency of Uttar Pradesh. He is the state Minister of Medical - Health and family welfare of Uttar Pradesh, in office since 15 March 2012.

Early life and education
Shankhlal Majhi was born in the village Mukhlispur, SantKabeer Nagar district, in the state of Uttar Pradesh in 1955. Majhi had represented Akbarpur

Majhi was elected to the Uttar Pradesh Legislative Assembly twice, in 2002 and 2012, for the katehari seat. He worked as a state minister of fisheries (independent), and is currently working as a state minister of Medical-health and family welfare.  He is a prominent Nishada face of Samajwadi Party among India's fishing community. Majhi was elected as member of Parliament in 2004.

Nishada Reserveration agenda
Majhi is the man who starts the war for Nishad society for SC reservation.

References

1955 births
Living people
Samajwadi Party politicians from Uttar Pradesh
People from Sant Kabir Nagar district
Uttar Pradesh MLAs 2012–2017